Julianne Morris (born May 8, 1968) is an American actress.

Early life 
Morris was born in South Carolina. Her family relocated to Windermere, Florida when she was young and she was raised there. She is the youngest of two children. Morris attended American Academy of Dramatic Arts in New York, and graduated from North Carolina School of the Arts.

Career 
In 1994, Morris landed a role as Tracy Pinkem in television film Witch Hunt. She played Amy Wilson on the soap opera The Young and the Restless from November 18, 1994 to May 22, 1996 and made a guest appearance on November 25, 2014. Morris portrayed Greta Von Amburg on Days of Our Lives from May 15, 1998 to April 19, 2002. She was first introduced on Days of Our Lives as "Swamp Girl". Between her time on Y&R and Days of Our Lives, Morris spent time in South Africa, playing Rumina on the fantasy television series The Adventures of Sinbad. She portrayed Amber Sullivan in television film Another Pretty Face (2002). She has also appeared on Two and a Half Men.

Personal life

Morris married actor Kristoffer Polaha on June 7, 2003 at the Windermere Chapel. The couple has three sons born in 2004, 2006, and 2011.

She is a practising Christian. She advocates sexual abstinence before marriage, saying "I believe marriage is ordained by God. The Bible teaches quite explicitly that the romantic attachment between a husband and a wife is a parallel to our relationship to God. There could be no stronger indication of its importance."

Filmography

References

External links
 

1968 births
Living people
American television actresses
American Christians
American soap opera actresses
Actresses from Columbia, South Carolina
American film actresses
People from Windermere, Florida
21st-century American women